Alex Crumbley Jr. (May 22, 1909 – November 20, 1938) was an American baseball outfielder in the Negro leagues. He played with the New York Black Yankees, Washington Black Senators, Pittsburgh Crawfords, and Atlanta Black Crackers from 1937 to 1938.

References

External links
 and Seamheads

Atlanta Black Crackers players
New York Black Yankees players
Pittsburgh Crawfords players
Washington Black Senators players
1909 births
1938 deaths
Baseball players from Georgia (U.S. state)
Baseball outfielders
20th-century African-American sportspeople